The Yearning is the debut studio album by Australian folk-rock band Things of Stone and Wood. The album was released in February 1993 and peaked at number 8 on the ARIA Charts.

At the ARIA Music Awards of 1994, the album was nominated for Best Cover Art and Breakthrough Artist – Album.

Reception

Jonathan Lewis from AllMusic said "The Yearning was a gem, full of the band's trademark bittersweet folk-pop, with an unmistakably Australian feel." adding "Much of Things of Stone and Wood's music dealt in familiar Australian images... from the Yarra River to songs about suburban Melbourne and the Housing Commission flats that dominate sections of the city's skyline. Things of Stone and Wood are also one of only a few Australian bands who deal in the sort of social commentary more usually associated with Midnight Oil, from the rise of racism in Australia to the slow destruction of the Australian Aboriginal culture, and inner-city decay. The Yearning was a superb debut from Things of Stone and Wood, mixing thoughtful lyrics with brilliant pop melodies."

Track listing

Charts

Certifications

Release history

References

1993 debut albums
Things of Stone and Wood albums